This is a list of Client portal software. For information on the subject, see Client portal.

Client portals
 Clinked
 Portalstack
 Hubshare USA
 Hubshare Canada
 Hubshare International
Huddle
Hyperoffice
 ShareFile
 Thomson Reuters NetClient CS
 Zoho

References

Groupware